Deborah Kay Fitzgerald is a professor of the History of Technology within in Science, Technology, and Society (STS) Program at the Massachusetts Institute of Technology. She has authored two books titled The Business of Breeding: Hybrid Corn in Illinois, 1890-1920 and Every Farm a Factory: The Industrial Ideal in American Agriculture, which discuss her findings on the industrialization of agriculture in the early 20th century.

Biography

Early life 
Deborah Kay Fitzgerald started her life as the youngest child with three older siblings and grew up with her two parents in Remson, Iowa, a small town on the west side of the state with about 1,600 people total. The town is known for as a hub for immigrants from Luxembourgescaping religious persecution in east Europe. So for her family not being from Luxembourg or having too much in common with the people of Remsen, she decided that going to college out of state would benefit her the best.

College 
She briefly attended the University of Northern Colorado after high school and dropped out after one semester after becoming pregnant. She returned to Remsen and ended up staying in a maternity home until she had the baby and was able to give the child up for adoption. She returned to college, this time at Iowa State University, and graduated with a Bachelor of Arts degree in History and English in 1978. Fitzgerald took her academic career seriously and found she fit well in the collegiate scene after discovering her love for learning and writing. She pursued her interest in history after studying writers of the 19th century and how they responded to the Scientific Revolution. She was drawn into this responsiveness and wanted to study the global changes that were eliciting these responses, which ultimately led her to history.  

After graduating from Iowa State, she moved to Wynnefield, Philadelphia with her husband Eric Sealine and attended graduate school at the University of Pennsylvania and found an interest in agricultural hybridization, specifically that of corn, from taking classes at UPENN as well as through her advisor and influencer, Charles E. Rosenberg. She returned to her hometown of Remsen to interview farmers that were doing experiments related to corn hybridization. Also within this time she had given birth to her son, which she found out was a challenge in and of itself while also writing her dissertation.

Career 
A year into writing her dissertation she was offered a one year job at Harvard University by Everett Mendelsohn, shocking both her male colleagues and even herself.

After finishing up her Ph.D. in History and the Sociology of Science at UPenn. in 1985, she moved with her son and husband to Cambridge, Massachusetts. She proved her abilities at Harvard by starting her second year in the History of Science as the lead tutor in the department. She was only at Harvard for three years before she took up a job at MIT as a historian of technology in 1988. This was the same year that the STS graduate program at MIT was brand new, giving Fitzgerald the role of the director of graduate studies within the program, which she held for over five years. In 1996 she became a chairwoman of the Ph.D. program in history, anthropology, and STS until 2001. She was yet again asked to take on another job, this time by dean Philip Khoury, to become the associate dean of the MIT School of Humanities, Arts and Social Sciences (SHASS) on April 1, 2005. From here, she found an interest in administration through her love for learning how things are done and ways to improve them. Only being in the position for a year and a half, Khoury took a promotion in the provost office, leaving the seat of acting dean to Fitzgerald, which she happily took in 2006. She eventually took the permanent role of the Kenan Sahin Dean of SHASS in 2007 and held it until July 1, 2015.

Values

Humanities 
Deborah Kay Fitzgerald was very clear about the importance of humanities, arts and social sciences while holding the role of associate dean for SHASS. Aware of the discourse in collegiate realms where some argue that humanities are not necessary, she feels that STEM professionals need humanities to look at the world in a different, non-technical way and be able to confidently answer challenges human face. She feels that it is the job of Universities to teach students all skills necessary to solve issues in a wholly educated way of thinking.

Gender equity 
Fitzgerald became chair of The Gender Equity Committee in SHASS in June 2000 to report on the number of women in senior positions from 2001-2002. She recognized how many women in academia have felt isolated at least once in their career due to the lack of women in the field, specifically one in five.

Books 

 The Business of Breeding: Hybrid Corn in Illinois, 1890-1920 (1990)
 Every Farm a Factory: The Industrial Ideal in American Agriculture (2003)

Recognition 

 2003: Theodore Saloutos Prize for her book Every Farm a Factory: The Industrial Ideal in American Agriculture

References

Further reading

 Busch, L. M., & Fitzgerald, D. K. (1986). Tradition and Innovation in Agriculture: A Comparison of Public and Private Development of Hybrid Corn. In The Agricultural Scientific Enterprise: A system in transition. essay, Routledge.
 Fitzgerald, D. (1986). Exporting American agriculture: The Rockefeller Foundation in Mexico, 1943-53. Social Studies of Science, 16(3), 457–483. https://doi.org/10.1177/030631286016003003
 Fitzgerald, D. (1991). Beyond tractors: The history of technology in American Agriculture. Technology and Culture, 32(1), 114. https://doi.org/10.2307/3106015
 Fitzgerald, D. (1993). Farmers deskilled: Hybrid corn and farmers' work. Technology and Culture, 34(2), 324. https://doi.org/10.2307/3106539
 Fitzgerald, D. (2018). The profit of the earth: The global seeds of american agriculture. Journal of American History, 105(1), 145–145. https://doi.org/10.1093/jahist/jay034
 Fitzgerald, D. (2020). World War II and the quest for time-insensitive foods. Osiris, 35, 291–309. https://doi.org/10.1086/709509
 Fitzgerald, D. K. (2014, April 30). At MIT, the humanities are just as important as stem - The Boston Globe. BostonGlobe.com. Retrieved November 30, 2022, from https://www.bostonglobe.com/opinion/2014/04/30/mit-humanities-are-just-important-stem/ZOArg1PgEFy2wm4ptue56I/story.html
 Fitzgerald, D. K. (2020, July 23). A professor's last crucial decision: When to retire. The Chronicle of Higher Education. Retrieved November 30, 2022, from https://www.chronicle.com/article/a-professors-last-crucial-decision-when-to-retire/
 Fitzgerald, D., & Clarke, S. H. (1996). Regulation and the revolution in united states farm productivity. Technology and Culture, 37(4), 851. https://doi.org/10.2307/3107113
 Fitzgerald, D., Onaga, L., Pawley, E., Phillips, D., & Vetter, J. (2018). Roundtable: Agricultural history and the history of Science. Agricultural History, 92(4), 569. https://doi.org/10.3098/ah.2018.092.4.569

1953 births
Living people
Massachusetts Institute of Technology School of Science faculty
American food writers
American women non-fiction writers
20th-century American non-fiction writers
21st-century American non-fiction writers